Llannerch railway station was a private railway station on the Vale of Clwyd Railway. It was located close to Llannerch Hall, the home of Whitehall Dod who was a director of the Vale of Clwyd Railway company.  From the opening of the line in October 1858 Dod had the right to stop trains for his use at this location until December 1871 when Dod's privilege expired, the railway having been acquired by the London & North Western Railway in 1867.

References

Disused railway stations in Denbighshire
Former London and North Western Railway stations
Railway stations in Great Britain opened in 1858
Railway stations in Great Britain closed in 1871
Former private railway stations